Robert Edward Davis (born 28 December 1979), better known by his stage name B-Tight, is an American-born German rapper.

Early life 
Davis was born in Palm Springs, California, to a German mother and an African American father, but grew up in Berlin.

When he was younger, he initially wanted to become a professional basketball player, however, a foot injury prevented him from doing so. Davis grew up in Märkisches Viertel in Berlin, where he also met his later roommate and rap partner Sido, with whom he formed the duo A.i.d.S and they began to write song lyrics. The group's beats were made on a PlayStation.

Career

1998–2000: Early career 
Davis and Sido released their first demo album, Wissen Flow Talent, over hip hop label Royal Bunker, as duo called Royal TS. It follows more demo recordings of them, joined by Vokalmatador and Rhymin Simon. Later they formed group Die Sekte, but they broke up in  2000.  In the same year, released Davis' first release B-Tight sein Album as demo tape.

2001–2004: Rise to "fame" 
In 2001, B-Tight signed in January to Berlin-based label Aggro Berlin, as well as Sido. Both rapper released their EP Das Mic und ich as Royal TS and the labels official first release. B-Tight released his EP Der Neger (in mir), in 2002, but it caused controversies as its hard and aggressive song lyrics, which were typical for the labels music style. Later rapper Bushido signed, who joined B-Tight and Sido.

In 2002, B-Tight worked with his label mates on their label albums Aggro Ansage Nr. 1 and Aggro Ansage Nr. 2 (released 2003).

In 2005, Davis recorded songs with Tony D for their mixtape Heisse Ware.

Music 
B-Tight is affiliated with the music label Aggro Berlin with whom he released a number of hit singles; amongst them, "Der Neger". Another popular single was titled "Neger bums mich!" (Negro fuck me!) on the "Aggro Ansage Nr. 3". His songs often tell about a fight between black and white in himself.

Discography 

 2007: Neger Neger
 2008: Goldständer
 2012: Drinne
 2015: Retro
 2016: Born 2 B-Tight
 2017: Wer hat das Gras weggeraucht?
 2018: A.i.d.S. Royal
 2019: Aggroswing

References

External links
 Official website

German rappers
Musicians from Palm Springs, California
Musicians from Berlin
Living people
1979 births
German people of American descent
German people of African-American descent
American people of German descent
Participants in the Bundesvision Song Contest
Gangsta rappers
People from Reinickendorf